Fairmont Hot Springs Airport  is a registered aerodrome located adjacent to Fairmont Hot Springs, British Columbia, Canada.

References

External links

Registered aerodromes in British Columbia
Regional District of East Kootenay